"Where Were You Last Night" is a single by Swedish singer Ankie Bagger from the 1989 album Where Were You Last Night. Written by Norell Oson Bard, the single was released in October 1989 by Sonet Records. The song entered Swedish Trackslistan on 11 November 1989 and stayed on the chart for 6 weeks peaking at #4.

Track listing

Chart performance

Wink version 

Released on 4 July 1990 by Polystar Records, it was their eighth single, with Japanese lyrics written by Neko Oikawa. The B-side is a Japanese-language cover of Billie Hughes' "Welcome to the Edge".

Prior to the release of the single, Wink member Sachiko Suzuki was sidelined with acute hepatitis. Shoko Aida performed the song alone during TV appearances while Suzuki spent two weeks to recover.

The single peaked at No. 2 on Oricon's singles chart. It sold over 291,000 copies and was certified Gold by the RIAJ.

Track listing
All lyrics are written by Neko Oikawa; all music is arranged by Satoshi Kadokura.

Chart positions 
Weekly charts

Year-end charts

Certifications

Other versions
Finnish symphonic metal band Nightwish covered the song on their Wish I Had an Angel single.

References

External links
Ankie Bagger version
 

Wink version
 
 

1989 songs
1989 singles
1990 singles
Ankie Bagger songs
Songs written by Alexander Bard
Songs written by Tim Norell
Songs written by Ola Håkansson
Wink (duo) songs
Japanese-language songs
Songs with lyrics by Neko Oikawa